Daughter of the Mind is a 1969 American made-for-television horror-thriller film starring Don Murray, Ray Milland and Gene Tierney. It was first broadcast on ABC on December 9, 1969 as the ABC Movie of the Week. It was based on the book The Hand of Mary Constable (1964) by Paul Gallico.

Plot
At the request of a colleague, psychologist and ESP researcher Dr. Alex Lauder investigates leading cybernetic expert Dr. Samuel Hale Constable's claim that he has seen and spoken with his young daughter, Mary, who died 13 weeks before. Keeping an open mind, Lauder decides to take the case and see where it may lead.

As Lauder's investigation progresses, he learns that U.S. government counter-intelligence is watching his every move with great interest.  "Mary" appears to others besides her father (always preceded by Mary hauntingly calling out "Daddy"), including Lauder, Mary's mother and other acquaintances during a seance. "Mary" leaves physical evidence of her appearance (a tooth impression in wax, her voice on a recording and a wax mold of her hand--found in a clear bowl of water--that even has her fingerprints inside). "Mary" also tells Constable he must abandon his work if he wants to continue to see her. After learning from a major general how valuable disrupting Constable's work would be to the Soviet Union (a motive for deception), the possibility of "Mary" being a real spirit begins to erode in Lauder's mind. He starts to pursue the possibility that everything connected to Mary's appearances may be generated by elaborate human-made illusions to guilt Constable into abandoning his research (which, unbeknownst to Constable was being used by the U.S. military), and defecting to work for the Soviets to equalize their power. In the end, Lauder and the counter-intelligence agents monitoring Constable uncover a plot from behind the Iron Curtain to get the Nobel-winning scientist to defect from the United States.

Daughter of the Mind was one of the first high-quality offerings of ABC's Movie of the Week series.

Cast
 Don Murray as Alex Lauder
 Ray Milland as Professor Samuel Constable
 Gene Tierney as Lenore Constable
 Barbara Dana as Tina Cryder
 Edward Asner as Wiener
 Pamelyn Ferdin as Mary
 Ivor Barry as Dr. Cryder
 Virginia Christine as Helga
 George Macready as Dr. Frank Ferguson
 William Beckley as Arnold Bessimer
 John Carradine as Bosch
 Cecile Ozorio as Devi Bessimer
 Frank Maxwell as Augstadt
 Bill Hickman as Enemy Agent

See also
 The Sixth Sense (1972 ABC TV series)

References

External links
 

ABC Movie of the Week
1969 television films
1969 films
American horror television films
20th Century Fox Television films
Films directed by Walter Grauman
1969 horror films
Films based on works by Paul Gallico
1960s American films